Santa Monica City Council is the governing body of Santa Monica, California.  The council meets on the second and fourth Tuesday of each month.

Current council

Former councils

Charter

Council-Manager form of government, with seven Council members elected at-large. The new Charter was adopted in 1946.

Second charter (1915 -1946)

Commission form of government.  Under the new charter, the City government now consisted of 3 departments: Public Safety, Public Works and Finance with one elected Commissioner responsible for each department. The City Council consisted of the three elected Commissioners. The Commissioner of the Department of Public Safety was the ex officio Mayor; and the elections process included the use of a preferential ballot form.

First charter (1906 – 1915)

Mayor - Council form of government.  Under the new charter, the City Council was composed of one Mayor with veto power, and one Council member from each of its seven wards.

Board of trustees (1886 – 1906)

The residents of the town of Santa Monica voted to incorporate November 30, 1886, and chose a board of five trustees.

References
Commissions and Councils, 1915 - present
A Brief History of Santa Monica and its Charters

External links
Santa Monica City Council Homepage
City Council History

California city councils
Santa Monica, California